The Khobi class (Project 437N) is a class of replenishment oiler built for the Soviet navy between 1953 and 1958.

Construction
Ships of the Khobi class were built at the Zhdanov shipyard in Leningrad, USSR. They were small tankers, similar in size to US Navy gasoline tankers (AOG). The Project 437N could refuel one ship at a time over the bow. A total of 20 vessels were built for the Soviet Navy. Two vessels were later transferred to Albania in 1958-59 as Patos and Semani (ex-Linda?) and one vessel was transferred to Indonesia.

Ships in class
There were 20 vessels in the class.

Cheremshan black market activity
During 1995-1996, while operating as a wastewater/sludge lighter with the Northern Fleet, the Cheremshan stole 1,197.5 tons of fuel from other Russian Navy vessels.

References

External links
 Project 437N small seagoing tanker (English)

Cold War naval ships of the Soviet Union
Oilers
Auxiliary replenishment ship classes